Brad Dubberley (born 28 June 1981) is an Australian Paralympic wheelchair rugby Head Coach and former athlete.  He won a silver medal as an athlete at the 2000 Sydney Games and as the head coach at the 2008 Beijing Games in the mixed wheelchair rugby event. He is the head coach of the Australian Wheelchair Rugby team known as the Australian Steelers.

Playing career

Dubberley was born in the New South Wales town of Kurri Kurri on 28 June 1981.  He became a quadriplegic at the age of 12 when he fell down a 50 m cliff while playing with friends in the bush in Victoria.  In 1995, at the age of 14, he took up wheelchair rugby as part of the rehabilitation process. His classification level was 3.5. He first represented Australia in 1996 in a test series with New Zealand. At 1998 World Wheelchair Rugby Championships, he was member of the team that came 5th. At the 2000 Sydney Games, he was a member of the team that won the silver medal. At the 2002 World Wheelchair Rugby Championships, he was a member of the team that won the bronze medal. At the 2004 Athens Games, he was a member of the team that came 5th. His last major competition as an athlete was at the 2006 World Wheelchair Rugby Championships, where the team came 6th. During his career as an athlete, he competed in over 70 international competitions.

Coaching career

In 1998 he was the Australian Junior Paralympian of the Year. In 2009, he was awarded the Primary Club of Australia's Sir Roden Cutler Award for his services to wheelchair rugby.  Dubberley is a frequent visitor to spinal units offering advice and support. His message is "Don't let the chair, stop you from doing anything".

Dubberley retired from competition in 2006 and in November of that year was appointed as head coach of the Australian Wheelchair Rugby team. He coached the team to a silver medal at the 2008 Beijing Games  and the 2010 World Wheelchair Rugby Championships.  He is preparing the team for the 2012 London Games. He coached the Australian national wheelchair rugby team at the 2012 Summer Paralympics, which  went through the five-day tournament undefeated and won the gold medal.  He was the head coach at the 2016 Rio Paralympics where the team won Gold.

At the 2018 World Championships in Sydney, he was Head Coach of the Australian team that won the silver medal after being defeated by Japan 61–62 in the gold medal game. Dubberley coached the Steelers to win the gold medal at the 2022 IWRF World Championship in Vejle, Denmark, when they defeated the United States . 

He currently lives in Point Cook, Victoria.

References

External links 
 

Paralympic wheelchair rugby players of Australia
Wheelchair rugby players at the 2000 Summer Paralympics
Wheelchair rugby players at the 2004 Summer Paralympics
Coaches at the 2012 Summer Paralympics
Paralympic silver medalists for Australia
Wheelchair category Paralympic competitors
Paralympic coaches of Australia
Coaches at the 2008 Summer Paralympics
Coaches at the 2016 Summer Paralympics
Paralympic wheelchair rugby coaches
People with tetraplegia
Sportsmen from New South Wales
1981 births
Living people
Medalists at the 2000 Summer Paralympics
Paralympic gold medalists for Australia
Medalists at the 2008 Summer Paralympics
Medalists at the 2012 Summer Paralympics
Medalists at the 2016 Summer Paralympics
Paralympic medalists in wheelchair rugby